LLV may refer to:

 Grumman LLV (Long Life Vehicle), an American light transport truck model
 Lockheed Launch Vehicle, former name for Athena (rocket family)
 Lüliang Airport (IATA airport code LLV), Lüliang in Shanxi Province, China
 Llandovery railway station (station code LLV), Llandovery, Carmarthenshire, Wales, UK
 General Motors LLV (Vortec 2900), a motor engine
 Luxor Las Vegas, a hotel and casino on the Las Vegas Strip in Paradise, Nevada
 LLv, squadron designator for the Finnish Air Force

See also

 LV (disambiguation)
 LL5, a type of LL chondrite
 L55 (disambiguation)